The All-Big East men's basketball team is an annual Big East Conference honor bestowed on the best players in the conference following every college basketball season.

Players are listed by number of votes, with the player who received the most votes listed first.

Selections

1980–1989

1990–1999

2000–2009

2010–2019

2020–present

See also 
Big East Conference (1979–2013)

References

External links 
All-Big East Conference Winners at Sports-Reference.com

All-Big East
Lists of college men's basketball players in the United States
All-Big East